Lawrence Morley Hillman (February 5, 1937 – May 31, 2022) was a Canadian professional ice hockey defenceman and coach. One of the most travelled players in hockey history, he played for 15 different teams in his 22 professional seasons. He played in the National Hockey League (NHL) between 1955 and 1973, and then in the World Hockey Association (WHA) from 1973 to 1976. After retiring he spent parts of three seasons as a coach in the WHA. Hillman had his name engraved on the Stanley Cup six times during his playing career.

Early life
Hillman was born in Kirkland Lake, Ontario, on February 5, 1937.  He began his junior career by playing one season for the Windsor Spitfires of the Ontario Hockey League (OHL) in 1953.  After joining the Hamilton Tiger Cubs in the middle of the 1953–54 season, he joined the Detroit Red Wings in 1955.

Playing career
Hillman made his NHL debut for the Red Wings on March 5, 1955, against the New York Rangers at Detroit Olympia.  He won his first Stanley Cup championship with the franchise later that year, becoming the youngest player to have his name engraved on the Stanley Cup, at 18 years, two months, nine days old.  This is a record that cannot be broken under the current rules, as a player must be 18 years old by September 15 to be eligible to play in the NHL that season.  He split the following season between the Buffalo Bisons of the American Hockey League (AHL) and Detroit.  Hillman subsequently left the Red Wings after the 1956–57 season and went to the Boston Bruins.  He scored his first goal for the Bruins on December 19, 1957, in a 3–3 tie with New York at Boston Garden.  He led the league with 70 games played that season.  He ultimately played two full seasons in Boston before being sent to their minor league team, the Providence Reds, for most of the 1959–60 season.

Hillman went to the Toronto Maple Leafs in 1961 and continued to bounce from the minor leagues to the NHL and back.  He played on four Stanley Cup-winning teams in Toronto in 1962, 1963, 1964, and 1967.  In between those Cup wins he played parts of six seasons with the Rochester Americans and the Springfield Indians.  Hillman was named to AHL All-Star First Team in 1965 and captained the Americans to the their first Calder Cup later that year.

Following the 1967–68 season, Hillman signed with the expansion Minnesota North Stars who later traded Hillman to the Montreal Canadiens, with whom he won his sixth and final Stanley Cup championship in 1969.  He was one of only 11 players to win the Stanley Cup with three or more different teams.  During the 1969–70 season, he again led the NHL in games played (76).

After Montreal, Hillman played for the Philadelphia Flyers, Los Angeles Kings, and Buffalo Sabres.  Following the 1972–73 season, he left the NHL for the World Hockey Association, and played two seasons for the Cleveland Crusaders. His final season was in 1975–76, playing for the Winnipeg Jets.

Coaching career
After his playing career ended, Hillman took over as coach of the Jets in 1977.  He led the franchise to the Avco Cup in his rookie season, in which he recorded a .638 winning percentage (50–28–2).  However, he was fired 61 games into the 1978–79 campaign, after the Jets went 28–27–6.

Personal life
Hillman was the older brother of NHL and WHA defencemen Wayne Hillman and Floyd Hillman.  He was also the uncle of former NHL forward Brian Savage.  Hillman was married to Liz until his death.  During his later years, they resided in a townhouse on Lake Timiskaming, close to where he was born.

Hillman died at a hospital in Sudbury, Ontario on May 31, 2022, at the age of 85.

Career statistics

Regular season and playoffs

Coaching record

Achievements
1955 Stanley Cup champion  (Detroit Red Wings)
1962 Stanley Cup champion  (Toronto Maple Leafs)
1963 Stanley Cup champion  (Toronto Maple Leafs)
1964 Stanley Cup champion  (Toronto Maple Leafs)
1965 Calder Cup Champion (Rochester Americans)
1967 Stanley Cup champion  (Toronto Maple Leafs)
1969 Stanley Cup champion  (Montreal Canadiens)
1976 Avco Cup champion  (Winnipeg Jets)
1978 Avco Cup champion  (Winnipeg Jets)  (Head coach)

References

External links
 
Larry Hillman's Day With the Stanley Cup

1937 births
2022 deaths
Place of death missing
Boston Bruins players
Buffalo Bisons (AHL) players
Buffalo Sabres players
Canadian ice hockey coaches
Canadian ice hockey defencemen
Cleveland Crusaders players
Detroit Red Wings players
Edmonton Flyers (WHL) players
Hamilton Tiger Cubs players
Ice hockey people from Ontario
Los Angeles Kings players
Minnesota North Stars players
Montreal Canadiens players
Philadelphia Flyers players
Providence Reds players
Rochester Americans
Sportspeople from Kirkland Lake
Springfield Indians players
Stanley Cup champions
Toronto Maple Leafs players
Windsor Spitfires players
Winnipeg Jets (1972–1996) coaches
Winnipeg Jets (WHA) players